This is a list of marathon runs in Central America and South America.

Legend

Race list

By continent 

 List of marathon races in Africa
 List of marathon races in Asia
 List of marathon races in Australia
 List of marathon races in Europe
 List of marathon races in North America
 List of marathon races in South America

See also 

 IAAF Road Race Label Events
 World Marathon Majors

References

External links 
 List of marathons 1940–present (Association of Road Racing Statisticians)
 List of marathons from Association of International Marathons and Road Races

 
Marathon
Marathon races, South America
Marathon races